There were many recorded and unrecorded battles during the Japanese invasions of Korea between 1592 and 1598. The major battles include:

1592
Siege of Busan
Battle of Tadaejin
Siege of Tongnae
Battle of Sangju
Battle of Chungju
Hamgyong campaign – Also known as Kato's Northern Campaign
Battle of Okpo – First major naval battle between the invading Japanese fleet and Korea
Battle of Sacheon – First naval battle to utilize Turtle ships
Battle of Imjin River
Dangpo Battle – Naval battle
Danghangpo Battle (1592) – Naval battle
Battle of Hansando – Naval battle
Siege of Pyeongyang – The city was sieged twice in one year
Battle of Jeonju
Battle of Chongju
Battle of Busan – Naval battle
Siege of Jinju – First siege of Jinju
Battle of Yongin - Major Japanese Victory over Joseon Efforts to retake Hanseong 
1593
Siege of Pyeongyang
Battle of Byeokjegwan
Siege of Haengju 
Siege of Jinju – The second siege on Jinju castle (Japanese victory)
Battle of Haejeongchang – Part of the Hamgyong campaign
Danghangpo Battle (1593) – Naval battle
1597
Battle of Chilchonryang – Naval battle
Siege of Namwon
Battle of Myeongnyang – Naval battle
Siege of Ulsan – First siege of Ulsan
Battle of Hwawangsan
1598
Siege of Suncheon
Siege of Ulsan – Second siege of Ulsan
Battle of Sacheon – Land battle
Battle of Noryang Point – Final naval battle

See also
Timeline of the Japanese invasions of Korea (1592–1598)
List of naval battles in Japanese invasions of Korea (1592–1598)
History of Korea
Military history of Korea
Military history of Japan

Japanese invasions of Korea
 
Japanese invasions
Korea